The Women's team pursuit was held on 21 October 2011 with 12 teams participating.

Medalists

Results

Qualifying 
Fastest 2 teams race for gold and 3rd and 4th teams race for bronze. It was held at 13:00.

Finals
The final was held at 20:00.

References

2011 European Track Championships
European Track Championships – Women's team pursuit